AeroWings 2: Airstrike, known in Japan as , is a combat flight simulator developed and published by CRI, Crave Entertainment, and Ubi Soft for the Dreamcast console. It is the sequel to AeroWings. An updated version of the game, called , was released for Dreamcast and Microsoft Windows only in Japan on November 16, 2000.

Gameplay
Unlike its predecessor, AeroWings 2 deals with air combat training (being, in that sense, a simulation of a simulation), rather than aerial stunts.

Reception

The game received "average" reviews according to the review aggregation website Metacritic. Jeff Lundrigan of NextGen gave the game generally positive review. In Japan, Famitsu gave it a score of 32 out of 40 for the original game, and 30 out of 40 for the updated Dreamcast version.

References

External links
Official Japanese website

2000 video games
Crave Entertainment games
Dreamcast games
Combat flight simulators
Ubisoft games
Video game sequels
Video games developed in Japan
Windows games
Multiplayer and single-player video games
CRI Middleware games